West Bay refers to a few different places in the Canadian province of Nova Scotia:

Cumberland County 
 West Bay, Cumberland County, a rural community

Inverness County 
 West Bay, Inverness County, an unincorporated place
 West Bay Centre, Nova Scotia
 West Bay Road, Nova Scotia